Mithu Mukherjee is a former Test cricketer who represented the India national women's cricket team. She played a total of four Tests scoring a total of 76 runs and taking two wickets.

References

Indian women cricketers
India women Test cricketers
Bengali sportspeople
Cricketers from West Bengal
Living people
Bengal women cricketers
Sportswomen from West Bengal
Year of birth missing (living people)